Sally Todd (born Sarah Joan Todd; June 7, 1934) is an American actress and model. She was Playboy magazine's Playmate of the Month for the February 1957 issue. Her centerfold was photographed by David Sutton and Ed DeLong.

Film and television actress
Born in Missouri, and raised in Arizona, Todd's entertainment career began in 1952 when her mother encouraged her to enter The Miss Tucson Beauty Contest at the age of seventeen. She won first prize—an all-expense-paid trip to Hollywood. Upon arrival in Hollywood she took a job modelling teenage clothes, and swimwear for Cole of California.  She immediately got an uncredited part as a bathing suit model in the Jane Russell film, The French Line. 

In 1955 she moved to New York City to become one of 'The Carson Cuties' on The Johnny Carson Show. The show was short lived and she moved back to Hollywood when it ended in 1956.

She was spotted by a talent scout for 20th Century Fox. That led to a contract with the studio and a movie career that consisted mostly of B-movie roles in The Unearthly and Frankenstein's Daughter. Other motion pictures in which she performed are The Revolt of Mamie Stover (1956), The Saga of the Viking Women and Their Voyage to the Waters of the Great Sea Serpent (1957), Al Capone (1959), and G.I. Blues (1960).

Her television appearances include episodes of Dragnet (1958–1959), M Squad (1959), Johnny Ringo (1960), The Many Loves of Dobie Gillis (1960), 77 Sunset Strip (1960), and The Tab Hunter Show (1960)

Model
She was among the models who appeared at the 9th Annual Los Angeles Home Show in June 1954. She also posed for several album covers and men's magazines, including Playboy, in which she first appeared in a non-nude pictorial in June 1956.

Bibliography

References

External links

 
 
 

1934 births
Living people
1950s Playboy Playmates
Actresses from Tucson, Arizona
American film actresses
21st-century American women